I Can See Your Voice Thailand is a Thai television mystery music game show series based on the South Korean programme of the same name. Since its premiere on 13 January 2016, it has aired five seasons on Workpoint TV.

Gameplay

Format
Presented with a group of seven "mystery singers" identified only by their occupation, a guest artist must attempt to eliminate bad singers from the group without ever hearing them sing, assisted by clues and a celebrity panel over the course of four rounds. At the end of the game, the last remaining mystery singer is revealed as either good or bad by means of a duet between them and one of the guest artists.

The Thai version has two different formats:

Original format
Under the original format, the guest artist can eliminate one or two mystery singers after each round. The game concludes with the last mystery singer standing that depends on outcome of a duet performance with a guest artist.

Battle format (seasons 3–4)
Under the battle format (adopted from Giọng ải giọng ai), both opponents can eliminate one singer each in the first two rounds, and then both can choose one singer each to join the final performance in the third round. At the end of the game, the conditions for mystery singers chosen by opposing guest artists depending on the outcome of a final performance, if:

Rounds
Each episode presents the guest artist with seven people whose identities and singing voices are kept concealed until they are eliminated to perform on the "stage of truth" or remain in the end to perform the final duet.

Notes:

Production

Background and development
Workpoint Entertainment first announced the development of the series in January 2016. In an interview with CJ ENM format sales director Diane Min from K7 Media, she notably mentioned Thailand as the first country to began airing that subsequently became an international television game show franchise.

Filming
Tapings for the programme took place at the Workpoint Studio in Bang Phun, Mueang, Pathum Thani. In the fourth season, Bigo Live also co-produced the premiere episode.

Since from third to fourth season, the programme was filmed under health and safety protocols due to the COVID-19 pandemic.

Broadcast

History
I Can See Your Voice Thailand debuted on 13 January 2016. South Korean boy band Got7 became the first foreign guest artists to play in ICSYV franchise, as the second season immediately began airing on 16 August 2017, one week after the first-season finale. In collaboration with Bigo Live, Trinity played in the fourth season premiere on 4 November 2020. The fifth anniversary and its season (dubbed as Festival), was the first to feature cast and mystery singers applying on a random theme that premiered on 13 October 2021.  are the last guest artists to play the game, as the show bade farewell on 23 February 2022.

Overall, the series aired five seasons in six years of running uninterrupted broadcasts.  played in the 100th episode on 31 January 2018;  defeated Yingyong Yodbuangam under battle format in the 200th episode on 8 January 2020; and Apiwat Eurthavornsuk played in the 300th episode on 19 January 2022.

Special episodes and companion events
For the first two seasons, the series was pre-empted of airing such as mourning period on the demise of King of Thailand Bhumibol Adulyadej; then a Memorial Showcase episode was aired following that event. Other highlight episodes that have occasionally held are New Year's Countdown Showcase and Summer, Rainy and Winter Showcases (both for two seasons).

After the fourth season premiere, Bigo Live then spawned a companion event titled I Can See My Voice, in which the highest-voting participant would allow to perform a duet alongside one of the guest artists.

Cast
The series employs a team of "celebrity panelists" who decipher mystery singers' evidences throughout the game. Alongside with full-timers and additional ones, guest panelists also appear since the first season. Throughout its broadcast, the programme has assigned 15 different panelists.

Series overview

Accolades

Notes

References

 
2010s Thai television series
2020s Thai television series
2016 Thai television series debuts
Television series by Workpoint Entertainment
Thai television series based on South Korean television series
Thai-language television shows
Workpoint TV original programming